Late Night Tales: Fatboy Slim is the 19th DJ mix album released in the Late Night Tales series on Late Night Tales. It was mixed by British DJ Fatboy Slim.

Track listing

References 

Fatboy Slim
2007 compilation albums